Elliott Jordan Moore (born 16 March 1997) is an English professional footballer who plays as a defender for Oxford United.

Club career

Leicester City
Born in Coalville, England, Moore began his career with Leicester City at the age of 6, training with the club's Academy Development Group before signing a contract with the club at the age of 8. He gained his scholarship at the age of 16 and helped the under-18s reach the semi-final of the FA Youth cup in 2014–15. That team included several players that went on to play in the Premier League with Leicester's first team - Ben Chilwell, Hamza Choudhary and Harvey Barnes. He made his under-21s debut at the age of 16 against Coalville Town in the Westerby Cup Winners' Cup final on 31 July 2013. Moore went on to make over 60 appearances for the club at under-21 and under-23 levels and captained the under-23 side during the 2016–17 season. His performance in the 2014–15 season earned him a nomination for Leicester's Academy Player of the Year award but he lost out to Ben Chilwell.

On 18 May 2017, Moore was called up to the first team but appeared as an unused substitute in the 6–1 defeat to Tottenham Hotspur in the last game of the season. He joined the first team's pre-season tour to Austria and Asia during the Summer of 2017 and made his first appearance on 19 July 2017. He came on as a half-time substitute in the Asia Trophy semi-final win over West Bromwich Albion in front of a crowd of 40,000.

In August 2017, Moore signed a new two-year contract, keeping him at the King Power Stadium until July 2019, and he signed another two-year contract until 2020 the following June.

OH Leuven (loan)
His new contract with Leicester City included a loan deal that saw him join OH Leuven, also owned by King Power.

Moore immediately featured in the starting lineup at OH Leuven one day after signing for the club, in a 7–1 victory over Cercle Brugge. Moore quickly established himself in the side following his debut. On 27 August 2017, he scored the 8th goal for OH Leuven and his first for the club in an 8–0 cup win against Turnhout. He scored his first league goal for the club on 8 September 2017, in a 2–0 win over Tubize, and scored again on 3 October 2017, in a 3–0 win over Cercle Brugge. He captained the side for the first time, following an injury to Dimitri Daeseleire, in a 2–2 draw against Cercle Brugge on 2 February 2018, and also captained the following match against Lierse on 11 February 2018 before suffering an injury. Moore returned from injury as captain on 1 April 2018, in a 2–2 draw against Zulte Waregem. As the 2017–18 season progressed, Moore featured as captain in a number of matches, though OH Leuven failed to return to the Belgian top flight. Moore finished his first season at OH Leuven having made 35 appearances and scored 3 times in all competitions.

Following the 2017–18 season, Moore rejoined Leuven on loan for a second season.

Oxford United
Moore signed a three-year deal with Oxford United on 1 August 2019 for an undisclosed fee. He made his debut two days later as a 94th-minute substitute in United's first league game of the 2019–20 season at Sunderland. On 7 June 2022, Moore signed a new three-year deal, keeping him at the club until 2025.

International career
In June 2015, Moore was called up for the England U18 squad and made his only appearance for the side, in a 2–1 defeat over Russia U18.

In June 2017, he was called up for the England U20 squad for the first time ahead of Toulon Tournament. He made his England U20 debut on 1 June 2017 as a 68th-minute substitute in a 7–1 win over Cuba. He made his full debut three days later in a 2–1 win over Japan. England went on to win the Tournament and Moore received his first medal at international level.

Personal life
His father played football as a semi–professional.

References

External links

1997 births
Living people
Footballers from Leicester
English footballers
England youth international footballers
Association football defenders
Leicester City F.C. players
Oud-Heverlee Leuven players
Oxford United F.C. players
English Football League players
Challenger Pro League players
Expatriate footballers in Belgium
English expatriate footballers
English expatriate sportspeople in Belgium